Pigüé Airport is a public use airport serving Pigüé, a town in the Buenos Aires Province of Argentina. The airport is on the east edge of the town.

See also

Transport in Argentina
List of airports in Argentina

References

External links 
FallingRain - Pigüé Airport
OurAirports - Pigüé Airport

Airports in Argentina
Buenos Aires Province